Belnapia rosea  is a bacterium from the genus of Belnapia which has been isolated from forest soil on the Hainan Island in China.

References

External links
Type strain of Belnapia rosea at BacDive -  the Bacterial Diversity Metadatabase	

Rhodospirillales
Bacteria described in 2012